Plougourvest is a commune in the Finistère department of Brittany in north-western France.

See also
Communes of the Finistère department
Yann Larhantec Sculptor with work in Plougourvest cemetery

References

External links

Mayors of Finistère Association 

Communes of Finistère